Hinault is a surname. Notable people with the surname include:

Bernard Hinault (born 1954),  French cyclist
Sébastien Hinault (born 1974), French cyclist

Surnames of Breton origin